The 2021 CS Golden Spin of Zagreb was held on December 7–11, 2021 in Sisak, Croatia. It was part of the 2021–22 ISU Challenger Series. Medals were awarded in the disciplines of men's singles, women's singles, pairs, and ice dance.

The non-Challenger portion of the event for juniors was cancelled.

Entries 
The International Skating Union published the list of entries on November 15, 2021.

Changes to preliminary assignments

Results

Men

Women

Pairs

Ice dance

References

External links 
 Golden Spin of Zagreb at the International Skating Union
 Results

Golden Spin of Zagreb
CS Golden Spin
Golden Spin of Zagreb